is a Japanese manga series written and illustrated by Kaori Ozaki. It was serialized in Kodansha's Monthly Afternoon from September 2017 to February 2019, with its chapters collected in three tankōbon volumes. It was licensed in North America for English release by Vertical.

Publication
The Golden Sheep is written and illustrated by Kaori Ozaki. The series ran in Kodansha's Monthly Afternoon from September 25, 2017, to February 25, 2019. Kodansha collected its chapters in three tankōbon volumes, released from March 23, 2018, to April 23, 2019.

In North America, Vertical licensed the series for English release in 2018. The three volumes were released from September 24, 2019, to March 10, 2020.

Volume list

Reception
The Golden Sheep was one of twelve manga series to make the 2021 Young Adult Library Services Association's top 126 graphic novels for teenagers list.

See also
The Gods Lie, another manga series by the same author

References

External links
 

Kodansha manga
Seinen manga
Vertical (publisher) titles